Wildhurst is a ghost town located in Cherokee County, Texas. The town is located north of Forest.

History 
Wildhurst was established as a logging community, with Milton A. Smith moving his logging operations to the area from Chronister c1900.

References 

Geography of Cherokee County, Texas
Ghost towns in East Texas